The New York Times Building is a skyscraper at 620 Eighth Avenue, Manhattan, New York City, that was completed in 2007.

New York Times Building may also refer to:
 New York Times Building (41 Park Row), the home of the Times from 1889 to 1903
 One Times Square or The New York Times Tower, the Times headquarters from 1903 to 1913
 229 West 43rd Street or The New York Times Building, the Times headquarters on 43rd Street from 1913 to 2007